Lake Cerknica is an intermittent lake in the southern part of the Cerknica Polje, a karst polje in Inner Carniola, a region in southwestern Slovenia. The lake, oriented in the Dinaric direction from northwest to southeast, is present for the most part of the year. When full, it is the largest lake in the country. The plain is surrounded by the Javornik Hills to the south and Slivnica to the north, both belonging to Dinaric Alps. The lake is an important wildlife resort, especially as a nesting place for many bird species. Botanically, it is distinguished by amphibious plants. It is therefore a part of two Natura 2000 areas of protection and the focus of the Inner Carniola Regional Park, which covers additional Natura 2000 areas in the broader region. The largest settlement at the border of the lake is Cerknica, located north of the lake. Various watersports, including rowing, are popular on the lake.

Intermittent behavior 
In the summer, when the rainfall is slight, the lake is completely drained into the reservoirs lying below its level, and its bed is speedily covered with rich vegetation. With the returning heavy rains in autumn, the surrounding higher reservoirs are filled and discharge suddenly through the subterranean passages into the lake, so that the latter very rapidly regains its ordinary volume and may even inundate the surrounding country. The changes in level are, however, very irregular. Sometimes the lake does not disappear for several years, and it can remain dry for over a year, as it did in 1834–35. It is rich in fish, which disappear and return with the water.

Research history 

Strabo in his Geography mentions a "marsh called Lugeon" (helos Lougeon kaloumenon) which has been identified with Lake Cerknica, Lougeon being Strabo's Greek rendition of a local toponym, perhaps of Illyrian origin. It is Romanized as Lugeum. In November 1687 the Carniolan polymath Johann Weikhard von Valvasor described the lake in his letter to the Royal Society, an excerpt of which was published in the Society's Philosophical Transactions in December that year. He proposed a model of filling and emptying the lake, based on Cartesian mechanics. The first to accurately describe the functioning of Lake Cerknica was Tobias Gruber in 1781, followed in 1784 by Belsazar Hacquet.

Gallery

References

External links 

 Lake Cerknica at official Slovenia travel guide

Lakes of Inner Carniola
Intermittent lakes
Lake
Lake
Wetlands in Inner Carniola
Natura 2000 in Slovenia
Ramsar sites in Slovenia
Karst fields of Slovenia
Karst lakes